The Matra-Simca MS630 was a Group 5 prototype race car introduced in 1967 for the World Championship for Makes. The MS630 replaced the previous Matra MS620.  The car was initially designated as the Matra MS630, but when Simca sponsored Matra in 1969, it was renamed as the Matra-Simca MS630.

Racing History

1967
For 1967, Matra decided to use a 1.9-litre version of the BRM Formula One V8 engine. (capable of producing  at 9,000 RPM.) Matra planned to have Johnny Servoz-Gavin/Jean-Pierre Jaussaud to drive the MS630 at both the 1967 1000 km of Spa and 1967 1000km of Nürburgring but the entries for both races were withdrawn. The MS630 only made one appearance in 1967, the 24 Hours of Le Mans. Matra entered two cars for Servoz-Gavin/Jean-Pierre Beltoise and Jaussaud/Henri Pescarolo. Servoz-Gavin/Beltoise retired with a broken oil pipe and Jaussaud/Pescarolo also retired with broken suspension.

In the World Championship for Makes, Matra scored no points during the year.

1968
For 1968, Matra decided to use their 3.0 60º V12. The MS630 only made one appearance in 1968, the 24 Hours of Le Mans. Matra entered one car for Servoz-Gavin/Pescarolo but it retired with an accident caused by a puncture.

In the World Championship for Makes, Matra scored no points during the year for the second consecutive season.

1969
The first race of the season was the 1969 24 Hours of Daytona with Servoz-Gavin/Pescarolo but the car did not start the race due to a practice accident. The team skipped the 12 Hours of Sebring and BOAC 500. Matra entered the 1000 km of Monza with Servoz-Gavin/Jean Guichet but retired from the race with a fuel feed issue. The team skipped the 1969 Targa Florio. Matra planned to have Servoz-Gavin/Beltoise and Guichet ( who was scheduled to drive single handed) at the 1969 1000 km of Spa but the entry for the race was withdrawn and skipped the 1969 1000 km of Nürburgring. Matra entered four cars for the 24 Hours of Le Mans. Jean-Pierre Beltoise/Piers Courage in the new Matra-Simca MS650, Jean Guichet/Nino Vaccarella in the MS630, Nanni Galli/Robin Widdows and Johnny Servoz-Gavin/Herbert Müller were both in the updated Matra-Simca MS630/650 (A MS630 car with the parts from the MS650). Beltoise/Courage finished fourth followed by Guichet/Vaccarella in fifth, Galli/Widdows seventh and Servoz-Gavin/Müller retired when an electrical short circuit failed. For the Watkins Glen 6 Hours, Matra entered two cars for Servoz-Gavin/Pedro Rodriguez in the MS650 and Guichet/Widdows in the MS630/650. Servoz-Gavin/Rodriguez finished fourth and Guichet/Widdows retired with a broken clutch. The MS630 was retired before the 1000km of Zeltweg.

In the World Championship for Makes, Matra scored six points, earning it seventh in the championship. All points were scored by the MS650.

Complete World Championship for Makes results

 All points scored by the Matra-Simca MS650.

References 

Sports prototypes
Matra vehicles
24 Hours of Le Mans race cars
Mid-engined cars